Duke of Cambridge, one of several current royal dukedoms in the United Kingdom , is a hereditary title of specific rank of nobility in the British royal family. The title (named after the city of Cambridge in England) is heritable by male descendants by primogeniture, and has been conferred upon members of the British royal family several times.

The title of Duke of Cambridge, first created in 1660, superseded an earlier title of Earl of Cambridge. The title became extinct several times before being revived in 2011, when Queen Elizabeth II bestowed it on her grandson Prince William on 29 April 2011 upon his marriage to Catherine Middleton. Catherine became known as the Duchess of Cambridge.

History
The title was first granted in 1660 by King Charles II (immediately following the Restoration of the monarchy) to his infant eldest nephew Charles Stuart (1660–1661), the first son of the Duke of York (later King James II), though he was never formally created Duke of Cambridge as he died at the age of six months. The first officially recognised creation of the dukedom was in the Peerage of England in 1664, when King Charles II granted the title to his next eldest surviving nephew James Stuart, the infant second son of the Duke of York, who died early in 1667 at the age of three, when the title again became extinct. The title was then granted later that year by King Charles II to his next eldest surviving nephew Edgar Stuart, the third son of the Duke of York, who also died in infancy, in 1671 at the age of three, when the title became extinct the third time. The Duke of York's fourth son Charles (his eldest son by his second wife) was also styled Duke of Cambridge in 1677, but died when about a month old, not having lived long enough to be formally created duke.

The title was recreated by Queen Anne in 1706 who granted it to George Augustus (later King George II), son of the Elector of Hanover (later King George I), her distant cousin (both being descended from King James I). When the title was created George Augustus was third in line to the throne, after his grandmother Sophia and his father. When he ascended to the throne as King George II in 1727, the dukedom merged with the Crown.

The title was again recreated in the peerage of the United Kingdom and was granted in 1801 by King George III to his seventh son Prince Adolphus (1774–1850), then aged 27. Following his death in 1850 the title was inherited by his only son Prince George, 2nd Duke of Cambridge, whose three sons were barred from inheriting the title as his marriage had been in violation of the Royal Marriages Act 1772. Thus on the death of the 2nd Duke in 1904 the title again became extinct.

During the period leading up to the 1999 wedding of Prince Edward, the youngest son of Queen Elizabeth II, some people speculated that the Dukedom of Cambridge or Sussex were the most likely to be granted to him, and The Sunday Telegraph later reported that Prince Edward was at one point set to be titled Duke of Cambridge. Instead, Prince Edward was created Earl of Wessex, and it was announced that he would eventually be created the next Duke of Edinburgh after his father.

On 29 April 2011, the day of his wedding, it was announced that Queen Elizabeth II had created her grandson Prince William Duke of Cambridge, Earl of Strathearn and Baron Carrickfergus, titles relating respectively to places in England, Scotland and Northern Ireland, three of the constituent countries of the United Kingdom.

The letters patent granting these titles received the great seal on 26 May 2011. They were illuminated by Andrew Stewart Jamieson.

Dukes of Cambridge

Styled, 1660

| Charles StuartHouse of Stuart1660–1661
| 
| 22 October 1660Worcester House, Londonson of James, Duke of York (later King James II) and Anne Hyde
| not married
| 5 May 1661Whitehall Palace, Londonaged 6 months

|}

First creation, 1664

| James StuartHouse of Stuart1664–1667also: Earl of Cambridge and Baron of Dauntsey (1664)
| 
| 12 July 1663St James's Palace, Londonson of James, Duke of York (later King James II) and Anne Hyde
| not married
| 20 June 1667Richmond Palace, Londonaged 3

|}

Second creation, 1667

| Edgar StuartHouse of Stuart1667–1671also: Earl of Cambridge and Baron of Dauntsey (1667)
|
| 14 September 1667St James's Palace, Londonson of James, Duke of York (later King James II) and Anne Hyde
| not married
| 8 June 1671Richmond Palace, Londonaged 3

|}

Styled, 1677

| Charles StuartHouse of Stuart1677–1677
| 
| 7 November 1677St James's Palace, Londonson of James, Duke of York (later King James II) and Mary of Modena
| not married
| 12 December 1677St James's Palace, Londonaged 35 days

|}

Third creation, 1706

| Prince GeorgeHouse of Hanover1706–1727also: Marquess of Cambridge, Earl of Milford Haven, Viscount Northallerton and Baron Tewkesbury (1706–1727);Prince of Wales (1714), Duke of Cornwall (1337) and Duke of Rothesay (1398)
| 
| 30 October / 9 November 1683Herrenhausen, Hanoverson of Prince George of Brunswick-Lüneburg (later King George I) and Sophia Dorothea of Celle
| 22 August 1705Caroline of Ansbach10 children
| 25 October 1760Kensington Palace, Londonaged 76

|-
| colspan=5|Prince George succeeded as George II in 1727 upon his father's death, and his titles merged with the crown.

|}

Fourth creation, 1801

| Prince AdolphusHouse of Hanover1801–1850also: Earl of Tipperary and Baron Culloden (1801)
| 
| 24 February 1774Buckingham Palace, Londonson of King George III and Queen Charlotte
| 18 June 1818Princess Augusta of Hesse-Kassel3 children
| 8 July 1850Cambridge House, Londonaged 76

|-
| Prince GeorgeHouse of Hanover1850–1904also: Earl of Tipperary and Baron Culloden (1801)
| 
| 26 March 1819Cambridge House, Hanoverson of Prince Adolphus and Princess Augusta
| 8 January 1847Sarah Fairbrother3 children
| 17 March 1904Londonaged 84
|-
| colspan=5|Prince George's marriage to Sarah Fairbrother produced three sons. However, due to the Royal Marriages Act 1772, the marriage was invalid and all his titles became extinct on his death.

|}

Fifth creation, 2011

| Prince WilliamHouse of Windsor2011–presentalso: Earl of Strathearn and Baron Carrickfergus (2011); Duke of Cornwall, Duke of Rothesay and Prince of Wales (2022)
| 
| 21 June 1982St Mary's Hospital, Londoneldest son of Charles III and Diana, Princess of Wales
| 29 April 2011Catherine Middleton3 children
| Living (age )

|}

Line of succession
If William becomes king, his titles, including the dukedom, will merge with the crown. However, if he dies before becoming king, then his sons are eligible to inherit the dukedom:

 William, Prince of Wales (born 1982)
(1)  Prince George of Wales (born 2013) 
 (2)  Prince Louis of Wales (born 2018)

Family tree

See also
Duke of Cambridge's Personal Canadian Flag
Marquess of Cambridge
Earl of Cambridge

References

1660 establishments in England
1801 establishments in the United Kingdom
Dukedoms in the Peerage of the United Kingdom
2011 establishments in the United Kingdom
British and Irish peerages which merged in the Crown
Noble titles created in 1664
Noble titles created in 1667
Noble titles created in 1706
Noble titles created in 1801
Noble titles created in 2011
 
William, Prince of Wales